Sukanya Kalakar Parida (born May 15, 1993 in, Naamouza, Kendrapara, Odisha) is an Indian cricketer from Odisha. She plays for Bengal in domestic matches.

She made her international debut in 2016 against West Indies.

References

External links 

 

1997 births
Living people
People from Kendrapara district
Cricketers from Odisha
Sportswomen from Odisha
Indian women cricketers
Bengal women cricketers
Railways women cricketers
India women One Day International cricketers